Froman is a surname. Notable people with the surname include: 

Adam Froman (born 1987), American football player
David Froman
Ian Froman (born 1937), South African-born Israeli former tennis player and tennis patron
Jane Froman
Kyle Froman, ballet dancer
Menachem Froman (1945–2013), Israeli rabbi
Michael Froman
Sandra Froman

See also
Bengt Fröman
Frohman